Matheus Dória Macedo (born 8 November 1994), commonly known as Dória, is a Brazilian professional footballer who plays as a centre-back for Liga MX club Santos Laguna.

Club career

Botafogo
Born in São Gonçalo, Rio de Janeiro, Dória joined Botafogo's youth setup in 2009 at the age of 14. Promoted to the first team due to the injury of Brinner in January 2012, he made his professional – and Série A – debut on 27 May of that year, starting in a 3–2 away win over Cokaritiba.

On 27 October Dória scored his first professional goal, scoring the first in a 4–0 home routing of Atlético Goianiense. He finished his first professional season with 20 appearances, as his side finished seventh.

In the 2013 campaign, Dória was an undisputed starter for Bota, appearing in 30 league matches and scoring one goal as his side qualified to Copa Libertadores after a 17-year absence.

Marseille
On 1 September 2014 Dória signed a five-year deal with Olympique de Marseille for a reported fee of €7 million. He failed to make a first-team appearance following his arrival, being subsequently assigned to the reserves in Championnat de France amateur.

Loans to São Paulo and Granada
On 6 February 2015 Dória joined São Paulo FC, on loan until June. After appearing regularly, he moved to La Liga side Granada CF on 31 August, also in a temporary deal.

International career
Dória made his debut for Brazil on 6 April 2013, coming on as an 87th-minute substitute in a 4–0 win over Bolivia.

In June 2013, he was called to the Brazil U20 team as captain of the team who won the 2013 Toulon Tournament.

Honours
Botafogo
Campeonato Carioca: 2013

Brazil U20
Toulon Tournament: 2013, 2014

Individual
Liga MX Best XI: Guardianes 2021
Liga MX Best Defender: 2020–21
Liga MX All-Star: 2021

References

External links

1994 births
Living people
People from São Gonçalo, Rio de Janeiro
Brazilian footballers
Brazilian expatriate footballers
Brazil international footballers
Brazil youth international footballers
Association football defenders
Campeonato Brasileiro Série A players
Botafogo de Futebol e Regatas players
São Paulo FC players
Ligue 1 players
Olympique de Marseille players
La Liga players
Granada CF footballers
Süper Lig players
Yeni Malatyaspor footballers
Santos Laguna footballers
Liga MX players
Brazilian expatriate sportspeople in France
Brazilian expatriate sportspeople in Spain
Brazilian expatriate sportspeople in Turkey
Brazilian expatriate sportspeople in Mexico
Expatriate footballers in France
Expatriate footballers in Spain
Expatriate footballers in Turkey
Expatriate footballers in Mexico
Sportspeople from Rio de Janeiro (state)